The men's tournament of water polo at the 2020 Summer Olympics at Tokyo, Japan began on 25 July and ended on 8 August 2021. It was held at the Tokyo Tatsumi International Swimming Center. It was the 27th official appearance of the tournament, which was not held in 1896 and was a demonstration sport in 1904 but otherwise had been held at every Olympics.

On 24 March 2020, the Olympics were postponed to 2021 due to the COVID-19 pandemic. Because of this pandemic, the games are played behind closed doors.

Serbia won their second consecutive gold medal after a finals win over Greece, while Hungary captured the bronze medal.

The medals for the competition were presented by Nenad Lalović, IOC Executive Board Member; Serbia and the medalists' bouquets were presented by Andrey Kryukov, Kazakhstan; FINA Bureau Member.

Qualification

Schedule
The competition began on 25 July, and matches were held every other day. At each match time, two matches were played simultaneously (one from each group during preliminary round, two quarterfinals during that round, one main semifinal and one classification 5 to 8 semifinal during the semifinal round, and the two classification games on the final day) except for the bronze and gold medal matches.

Competition format
The twelve teams were seeded into two groups for a preliminary round. The teams in each group played a round-robin. The top four teams in each group advanced to the knockout round while the fifth- and sixth- placed teams were eliminated. The fifth placed teams were ranked ninth and tenth based on win–loss record, then goal average; the sixth-placed teams were ranked eleventh and twelfth in the same way. The knockout round began with quarterfinals and the winners advanced to the semifinals, while the quarterfinal losers played in the fifth- to eighth- place classification. The two semifinal winners played in the gold medal match, while the two semifinal losers played in the bronze medal match.

Draw
The draw took place on 21 February 2021 in Rotterdam, The Netherlands.

Seeding
The twelve teams in the men's tournament were drawn into two groups of six teams. The teams were seeded into six pots.

Final draw
The hosts Japan was drawn into Group A, while the reigning Olympic champion Serbia was drawn into Group B.

Referees
The following 28 referees were selected for the tournament.

24 referees:

  Germán Moller
  Nicola Johnson
  Marie-Claude Deslières
  Zhang Liang
  Nenad Periš
  Sébastien Dervieux
  Frank Ohme
  Georgios Stavridis
  György Kun
  Alessandro Severo
  Asumi Tsuzaki
  Viktor Salnichenko
  Stanko Ivanovski
  Michiel Zwart
  John Waldow
  Adrian Alexandrescu
  Arkadiy Voevodin
  Vojin Putniković
  Jeremy Cheng
  Dion Willis
  Xevi Buch
  Ursula Wengenroth
  Michael Goldenberg
  Daniel Daners

4 video assistant referees:

  Mladen Rak
  Alexandr Margolin
  Alexandr Shershnev
  Jaume Teixido

Group stage
The schedule was announced on 9 March 2021.

All times are local (UTC+9).

Group A

Group B

Knockout stage

Bracket

Fifth place bracket

Quarterfinals

5–8th place semifinals

Semifinals

Seventh place game

Fifth place game

Bronze medal game

Gold medal game

Final ranking

Medalists

Team statistics

Goals for

Source: Official Results Book (page 99)

Goals against

Source: Official Results Book (pages 113, 117, 121, 125, 129, 133, 136, 139, 143, 146, 150, 154)

Goal difference

Source: Official Results Book (pages 113, 117, 121, 125, 129, 133, 136, 139, 143, 146, 150, 154)

Saves

Source: Official Results Book (pages 113, 117, 121, 125, 129, 133, 136, 139, 143, 146, 150, 154)

Blocks

Source: Official Results Book (page 99)

Rebounds

Source: Official Results Book (page 99)

Steals

Source: Official Results Book (page 99)

Sprints won

Source: Official Results Book (page 99)

Turnovers

Source: Official Results Book (page 99)

Exclusions with substitution

Source: Official Results Book (page 99)

Player statistics

Multiple medalists

Four-time Olympic medalist(s): 3 players
 : Filip Filipović, Duško Pijetlović, Andrija Prlainović

Three-time Olympic medalist(s): 4 players
 : Milan Aleksić, Dušan Mandić, Stefan Mitrović, Gojko Pijetlović (GK)

Leading goalscorers

Source: Official Results Book (page 109)

Saves leaders

Source: Official Results Book (page 111)

Leading blockers

Source: Official Results Book (pages 113, 117, 121, 125, 129, 133, 136, 139, 143, 146, 150, 154)

Leading rebounders

Source: Official Results Book (pages 113, 117, 121, 125, 129, 133, 136, 139, 143, 146, 150, 154)

Steals leaders

Source: Official Results Book (pages 113, 117, 121, 125, 129, 133, 136, 139, 143, 146, 150, 154)

Leading sprinters

Source: Official Results Book (page 108)

Turnovers leaders

Source: Official Results Book (pages 113, 117, 121, 125, 129, 133, 136, 139, 143, 146, 150, 154)

Exclusions leaders

Source: Official Results Book (pages 113, 117, 121, 125, 129, 133, 136, 139, 143, 146, 150, 154)

Awards
The all-star team was announced on 8 August 2021.

References

Sources

Overall
 Water Polo – Olympic Schedule & Results | Tokyo 2020 Olympics 
 Water Polo – Olympic Reports | Tokyo 2020 Olympics
 Water Polo – Official Results Book | Tokyo 2020 Olympics (archive)
 Water Polo – Tournament Summary | Tokyo 2020 Olympics 
 Water Polo – Competition Officials | Tokyo 2020 Olympics

Tournament details
 Water Polo – Competition Schedule | Tokyo 2020 Olympics

Statistics
 Water Polo – Overall Team Statistics | Tokyo 2020 Olympics
 Water Polo – Team Statistics | Tokyo 2020 Olympics
 Water Polo – Individual Statistics | Tokyo 2020 Olympics
 Water Polo – Individual Statistics - Leading Scorers | Tokyo 2020 Olympics
 Water Polo – Goalkeeper Statistics | Tokyo 2020 Olympics
 Water Polo – Cumulative Statistics | Tokyo 2020 Olympics
 Australia, Croatia, Greece, Hungary, Italy, Japan, Kazakhstan, Montenegro, Serbia, South Africa, Spain, United States

Medallists and victory ceremony presenters
 Water Polo – Medallists | Tokyo 2020 Olympics 
 Water Polo – Victory Ceremony Presenters | Tokyo 2020 Olympics

External links
 Water Polo | Tokyo 2020 Olympics 
 Tokyo 2020 | FINA

Men's tournament
Men's events at the 2020 Summer Olympics